Joe Roberts is an American curler from Hibbing, Minnesota.

Awards
 United States Curling Association Hall of Fame:
 1994 (with all 1976 world champions team: skip Bruce Roberts, second Gary Kleffman and lead Jerry Scott).

Personal life
His older brother Bruce is a curler too and Joe's teammate.

Teams

References

External links
 

Living people
American male curlers
World curling champions
American curling champions
Sportspeople from Hibbing, Minnesota
Year of birth missing (living people)